is a former Japanese football player. She played for Japan national team.

Club career
Sato was born in Isesaki on January 1, 1976. After graduating from high school, she joined Nikko Securities Dream Ladies in 1994. The club was disbanded in 1998 due to financial strain. She moved to OKI FC Winds in 1999. However, the club was disbanded end of season. She moved to YKK Tohoku Ladies SC Flappers (later TEPCO Mareeze) in 2000. In 2000 season, she was selected Best Eleven. She retired in 2006.

National team career
On May 31, 2000, Sato debuted for Japan national team against Australia. She played at 2001 AFC Championship. She played 17 games and scored 4 goals for Japan until 2002.

National team statistics

References

1976 births
Living people
Association football people from Gunma Prefecture
Japanese women's footballers
Japan women's international footballers
Nadeshiko League players
Nikko Securities Dream Ladies players
OKI FC Winds players
TEPCO Mareeze players
Women's association football forwards